This page covers all the important events in the sport of tennis in 2006. Primarily, it provides the results of notable tournaments throughout the year on both the ATP and WTA Tours, the Davis Cup, and the Fed Cup.

Roger Federer triumphed in four top tennis contests in 2006: Wimbledon, the Australian Open, the US Open, and the Tennis Masters Cup. Amélie Mauresmo won at Wimbledon and the Australian Open; while Justine Henin-Hardenne won the French Open and the WTA Tour Championships. Other champions that year included Rafael Nadal in the French Open, and Maria Sharapova in the US Open.  In international team competitions, the Russian men's team beat Argentina to win the Davis Cup, and the Italian women's team beat Belgium to win the Fed Cup.

ITF

Grand Slam events
Australian Open (January 16 – January 29)
Men's Singles:  Roger Federer d.  Marcos Baghdatis, 5–7, 7–5, 6–0, 6–2.
Women's Singles:  Amélie Mauresmo d.  Justine Henin-Hardenne, 6–1, 2–0, Henin-Hardenne retires.
Men's Doubles:  Bob Bryan &  Mike Bryan d.  Martin Damm &  Leander Paes, 4–6, 6–3, 6–4.
Women's Doubles:  Zi Yan &  Jie Zheng d.  Samantha Stosur &  Lisa Raymond, 2–6, 7–6(9–7), 6–3.
Mixed Doubles:  Martina Hingis &  Mahesh Bhupathi d.  Elena Likhovtseva &  Daniel Nestor, 6–3, 6–3.
French Open (May 28 – June 11) – Details
Men's Singles:  Rafael Nadal d.  Roger Federer, 1–6, 6–1, 6–4, 7–6(7–4).
Women's Singles:  Justine Henin-Hardenne d.  Svetlana Kuznetsova, 6–4, 6–4.
Men's Doubles:  Jonas Björkman &  Max Mirnyi d.  Bob Bryan &  Mike Bryan, 6–7(5–7), 6–4, 7–5.
Women's Doubles:  Lisa Raymond &  Samantha Stosur d.  Daniela Hantuchová &  Ai Sugiyama, 6–3, 6–2.
Mixed Doubles:  Katarina Srebotnik &  Nenad Zimonjić d.  Elena Likhovtseva &  Daniel Nestor, 6–3, 6–4.
Wimbledon – Details
Men's Singles:  Roger Federer d.  Rafael Nadal, 6–0, 7–6(7–5), 6–7(2–7), 6–3.
Women's Singles:  Amélie Mauresmo d.  Justine Henin-Hardenne, 2–6, 6–3, 6–4.
Men's Doubles:  Bob Bryan &  Mike Bryan† d.  Fabrice Santoro &  Nenad Zimonjić, 6–3, 4–6, 6–4, 6–2.
Women's Doubles:  Zi Yan &  Jie Zheng d.  Virginia Ruano Pascual &  Paola Suárez, 6–3, 3–6, 6–2.
Mixed Doubles:  Vera Zvonareva &  Andy Ram d.  Venus Williams &  Bob Bryan, 6–3, 6–2.
U.S. Open
Men's Singles:  Roger Federer d.  Andy Roddick, 6–2, 4–6, 7–5, 6–1.
Women's Singles:  Maria Sharapova d.  Justine Henin-Hardenne, 6–4, 6–4.
Men's Doubles:  Martin Damm &  Leander Paes d.  Jonas Björkman &  Max Mirnyi, 6–7(5–7), 6–4, 6–3.
Women's Doubles:  Nathalie Dechy &  Vera Zvonareva d.  Dinara Safina &  Katarina Srebotnik, 7–6(7–5), 7–5.
Mixed Doubles:  Martina Navratilova &  Bob Bryan d.  Květa Peschke &  Martin Damm, 6–2, 6–3.

Davis Cup

World Group Draw

S-Seeded
U-Unseeded
 *Choice of ground

World Group Playoffs

Date: 22 Sep – 24 Sep

Fed Cup
World Group I Draw

 S-Seeded
 U-Unseeded
 *Choice of ground

{{8TeamBracket 
| RD1=Quarterfinals
| RD2=Semifinals
| RD3=Final
| RD1-seed1=S
| RD1-team1= France*
| RD1-score1=1
| RD1-seed2=U
| RD1-team2= Italy
| RD1-score2=4
| RD1-seed3=S
| RD1-team3= Spain*
| RD1-score3=5
| RD1-seed4=U
| RD1-team4= Austria 
| RD1-score4=0
| RD1-seed5=U
| RD1-team5= Germany*
| RD1-score5=2
| RD1-seed6=S
| RD1-team6= United States 
| RD1-score6=3| RD1-seed7=U
| RD1-team7= Belgium*
| RD1-score7=3| RD1-seed8=S
| RD1-team8= Russia 
| RD1-score8=2
| RD2-seed1=U
| RD2-team1= Italy| RD2-score1=3| RD2-seed2=S
| RD2-team2= Spain*
| RD2-score2=1
| RD2-seed3=S
| RD2-team3= United States
| RD2-score3=0
| RD2-seed4=U
| RD2-team4= Belgium*
| RD2-score4=4| RD3-seed1=U
| RD3-team1= Italy| RD3-score1=3| RD3-seed2=U
| RD3-team2= Belgium
| RD3-score2=2
}}

Hopman Cup
Final: USA d. Netherlands, 2–1.
Team USA: Lisa Raymond & Taylor Dent
Team Netherlands: Michaëlla Krajicek & Peter Wessels

ATP
2006 ATP calendar

Tennis Masters Cup
Shanghai, People's Republic of China, indoor  (November 11 – 18)
Singles:  Roger Federer d.  James Blake, 6–0, 6–3, 6–4.
Doubles:  Jonas Björkman &  Max Mirnyi d.  Mark Knowles &  Daniel Nestor, 6–2, 6–4.

ATP Masters Series
Indian Wells, outdoor hardcourt (March 10 – 19)
Singles:  Roger Federer d.  James Blake, 7–5, 6–3, 6–0.
Doubles:  Mark Knowles &  Daniel Nestor d.  Bob Bryan &  Mike Bryan, 6–4, 6–4.
Miami, outdoor hardcourt (March 23 – April 2)
Singles:  Roger Federer d.  Ivan Ljubičić, 7–6(7–5), 7–6(7–4), 7–6(8–6).
Doubles:  Jonas Björkman &  Max Mirnyi d.  Bob Bryan &  Mike Bryan, 6–4, 6–4.
Monte Carlo, outdoor clay (April 17 – 23)
Singles:  Rafael Nadal d.  Roger Federer, 6–2, 6–7(2–7), 6–3, 7–6(7–5).
Doubles:  Jonas Björkman &  Max Mirnyi d.  Fabrice Santoro &  Nenad Zimonjić, 6–2, 7–6.
Rome, outdoor clay (May 8–14)
Singles:  Rafael Nadal d.  Roger Federer, 6–7(0–7), 7–6(7–5), 6–3, 2–6, 7–6(7–5).
Doubles:  Mark Knowles &  Daniel Nestor d.  Jonathan Erlich &  Andy Ram, 6–4, 5–7, 13–11 (Match TB).
Hamburg, outdoor clay (May 15–20)
Singles:  Tommy Robredo d.  Radek Štěpánek, 6–1, 6–3, 6–3.
Doubles:  Paul Hanley &  Kevin Ullyett d.  Mark Knowles &  Daniel Nestor, 6–2, 7–6(10–8).
Toronto, outdoor hardcourt (August 7–13)
Singles:  Roger Federer d.  Richard Gasquet, 2–6, 6–3, 6–2.
Doubles:  Bob Bryan &  Mike Bryan d.  Paul Hanley &  Kevin Ullyett, 6–3, 7–5.
Cincinnati, outdoor hardcourt (August 14 – 20)
Singles:  Andy Roddick d.  Juan Carlos Ferrero, 6–3, 6–4.
Doubles:  Jonas Björkman &  Max Mirnyi d.  Bob Bryan &  Mike Bryan, 3–6, 6–3, 10–7 (Match TB).
Madrid, indoor greenset (October 16–22)
Singles:  Roger Federer d.  Fernando González, 7–5, 6–1, 6–0.
Doubles:  Bob Bryan &  Mike Bryan d.  Mark Knowles &  Daniel Nestor, 7–5, 6–4.
Paris, indoor carpet (October 30 – November 5)
Singles:  Nikolay Davydenko d.  Dominik Hrbatý, 6–1, 6–2, 6–2.
Doubles:  Arnaud Clément &  Michaël Llodra d.  Fabrice Santoro &  Nenad Zimonjić, 7–6(7–4), 6–2.

ARAG ATP World Team Cup
(May 21 – May 27)

 TP: Ties Played
 TW: Ties Won
 MW: Matches Won
 SW: Sets Won

Final: Croatia d. Germany, 2–0.
Team Croatia: Mario Ančić, Ivan Ljubičić, Ivo Karlović
Team Germany: Nicolas Kiefer, Alexander Waske

Sony Ericsson WTA Tour
2006 WTA calendar

Sony Ericsson WTA Tour Championships
Madrid, Spain (November 6–11)
Singles:  Justine Henin-Hardenne d.  Amélie Mauresmo, 6–4, 6–3.
Doubles:  Lisa Raymond &  Samantha Stosur d.  Cara Black &  Rennae Stubbs, 3–6, 6–3, 6–3.

WTA Tier I
Tokyo, Japan: Toray Pan Pacific Open, indoor carpet
Singles:  Elena Dementieva d.  Martina Hingis, 6–2, 6–0.
Doubles:  Lisa Raymond &  Samantha Stosur d.  Cara Black &  Rennae Stubbs, 6–2, 6–1.
Indian Wells, USA: Pacific Life Open, outdoor hardcourt (March 10 – March 19)
Singles:  Maria Sharapova d.  Elena Dementieva, 6–1, 6–2.
Doubles:  Lisa Raymond &  Samantha Stosur d.  Virginia Ruano Pascual &  Meghann Shaughnessy, 6–2, 7–5.
Miami, USA: NASDAQ-100 Open, outdoor hardcourt (March 23 – April 2)
Singles:  Svetlana Kuznetsova d.  Maria Sharapova, 6–4, 6–3.
Doubles:  Lisa Raymond &  Samantha Stosur d.  Liezel Huber &  Martina Navratilova, 6–4, 7–5.
Charleston, USA: Family Circle Cup, outdoor clay (April 10 – April 16)
Singles:  Nadia Petrova d.  Patty Schnyder, 6–3, 4–6, 6–3.
Doubles:  Lisa Raymond &  Samantha Stosur d.  Virginia Ruano Pascual &  Meghann Shaughnessy, 3–6, 6–1, 6–1.
Berlin, Germany: Qatar Total German Open, outdoor clay
Singles:  Nadia Petrova d.  Justine Henin-Hardenne, 4–6, 6–4, 7–5.
Doubles:  Zi Yan &  Jie Zheng d.  Elena Dementieva &  Flavia Pennetta, 6–2, 6–3.
Rome, Italy: Campionati Internazionali d'Italia, outdoor clay
Singles:  Martina Hingis d.  Dinara Safina, 6–2, 7–5.
Doubles:  Daniela Hantuchová &  Ai Sugiyama d.  Květa Peschke &  Francesca Schiavone, 3–6, 6–3, 6–1.
San Diego, USA: Acura Classic, outdoor hardcourt
Singles:  Maria Sharapova d.  Kim Clijsters, 7–5, 7–5.
Doubles:  Cara Black &  Rennae Stubbs d.  Anna-Lena Grönefeld &  Meghann Shaughnessy, 6–2, 6–2.
Montreal, Canada: Rogers Cup presented by National Bank, outdoor hardcourt
Singles:  Ana Ivanovic d.  Martina Hingis, 6–2, 6–3.
Doubles:  Martina Navratilova &  Nadia Petrova d.  Cara Black &  Anna-Lena Grönefeld, 6–1, 6–2.
Moscow, Russia: Kremlin Cup, indoor supreme
Singles:  Anna Chakvetadze d.  Nadia Petrova, 6–4, 6–4.
Doubles:  Květa Peschke &  Francesca Schiavone d.  Iveta Benešová &  Galina Voskoboeva, 6–4, 6–7(4–7), 6–1.
Zürich, Switzerland: Zurich Open
Singles:  Maria Sharapova d.  Daniela Hantuchová, 6–1, 4–6, 6–3.
Doubles:  Cara Black &  Rennae Stubbs''' d.  Liezel Huber &  Katarina Srebotnik, 7–5, 7–5.

Retired
September 3: Andre Agassi (United States)

International Tennis Hall of Fame
Class of 2006:
Pat Rafter, player
Gabriela Sabatini, player
Nancye Wynne Bolton, player
Gianni Clerici, contributor

References

 
Tennis by year